The 1901 Colgate football team was an American football team that represented Colgate University as an independent during the 1901 college football season. In its third and final season under head coach Charles B. Mason, the team compiled a 2–5 record. Arthur Griffen was the team captain. The team played its home games on Whitnall Field in Hamilton, New York.

Schedule

References

Colgate
Colgate Raiders football seasons
Colgate football